Ian James Nankervis (born 3 January 1948) is a former Australian rules footballer for the Geelong Football Club in the Victorian Football League (VFL). Nankervis played for Geelong for 17 seasons and was captain from 1978 to 1981, and again in 1983. Nankervis held the record of most senior level games for Geelong with 325 VFL games. Nankervis also represented Victoria at state level on 12 occasions.

VFL career
Nankervis was recruited from Barwon. Initially he played mainly as a forward pocket-rover, scoring a creditable 203 goals.   He later developed into one of the finest back pockets in the VFL after then coach Rodney Olsson shifted him to that end of the ground

Nankervis was awarded the club's best and fairest award, the Carji Greeves Medal on three occasions in 1972, 1976 and 1977 and captained the team from 1978 until 1982 (110 games). Nankervis wore a guernsey with the number 40 during his tenure at the club. His brother Bruce Nankervis also played for Geelong.

In 2001 he was named in the Geelong Football Club Team of the Century and in 2005 was inducted into the Australian Football Hall of Fame.

Honours
Individual:
 VFL:
 Victorian team representative honours: 12 matches (captain in 1979)
 All-Australian: 1980
 Member of the Australian Football Hall of Fame: 2005 induction
 Geelong Football Club:
 Carji Greeves Medal: 1972, 1976, 1977
 Geelong F.C. Leading Club Goalkicker Award: 1975 (equal with Larry Donohue)
 Geelong F.C. captain: 1978 – 1981, 1983
 Member of the Geelong F.C. Team of the Century: 2001 induction
 Records:
 Second most games played for Geelong F.C. (325 games) after Corey Enright broke the record in Round 19, 2016

Personal
Ian Nankervis, after retiring from football, taught physical education and science at a high school level, on Queensland's Sunshine Coast.
Ian Nankervis taught at Corio Technical School in Geelong during the 1970s

References

External links

 Profile at Geelongcats.com.au
 

Geelong Football Club players
Geelong Football Club captains
Australian Football Hall of Fame inductees
All-Australians (1953–1988)
Victorian State of Origin players
Carji Greeves Medal winners
Australian rules footballers from Geelong
Australian schoolteachers
Barwon Football Club players
1948 births
Living people
Australian rules footballers from Bendigo